TRNA CCA-pyrophosphorylase may refer to:
 CCA tRNA nucleotidyltransferase, an enzyme
 TRNA cytidylyltransferase, an enzyme